Le Tracassin ou Les Plaisirs de la ville is a French comedy film directed by Alex Joffé, released in 1961.

Plot
The stress of urban living, his sister's new baby and problems with his desire to move in with his girlfriend, the beautiful Juliette, push André to take too many euphoric pills made in the laboratory where he is employed.

Production
Source: IMDb
 Direction: Alex Joffé, assisted by D. Mage, F. Boucher, B. Chesnais
 Screenplay and adaptation: Jean Bernard-Luc, Alex Joffé
 Script: Jean Bernard-Luc
 Photography: Marc Fossard ; Paul Rodier and Serge Rapoutet (operators)
 Sound: René Sarazin
 Editing: Eric Pluet
 Music: Georges Van Parys (éditions Manèges)
 Scenery: Rino Mondellini ; Gabriel Béchir
 Make up: Janine Jarreau
 Hair: Henry Prévost
 Production: Pierre Cabaud, René Bézard
 Production company: Les Films Raoul Ploquin, Pathé Cinéma
 Distribution company: Consortium Pathé
 Format: Black and white - 35 mm - 1,37:1 - Monoaural sound (recorded by Poste Parisien)
 Principal photography: Studios « Franstudio »
 Prints: Laboratoire G.T.C de Joinville
 Genre: Comedy
 Length: 103 minutes
 Premier: 20 December 1961

Cast
Source: IMDb
 Bourvil: André Loriot, laboratory worker
 Pierrette Bruno: Juliette, André's mistress
 Maria Pacôme: Madame Gonzalès, the doctor's mistress
 Rosy Varte: restaurant patroness
 Micheline Luccioni: Jeannette, waitress on the restaurant
 Mireille Perrey: The boss of the Babylis shop
 Yvonne Clech: Music teacher
 Dominique Davray: Loriot's concierge
 Françoise Deldick: A walker
 Léo Campion: Monsieur Van Hooten
 Armand Mestral: Doctor Clairac, boss of André and Juliette
 Jean-Paul Coquelin: A policeman
 Harry-Max: Monsieur Crollebois, the locksmith
 Charpini: The hairdresser
 Mario David: Sports coach
 Teddy Bilis: The client at table 8
 Lucien Guervil: Another policeman
 Jean-Marie Proslier: The neighbour (rôle cut in editing)
 Étienne Bierry: The policeman in front of the foreign embassy
 Maurice Garrel: A traffic policeman
 Pierre Repp: The strawberry lover at the restaurant
 Antoinette Moya: The laboratory receptionist
 Alice Sapritch: A woman in the queue at the bank
 Jacqueline Jefford: A shop assistant at Babylis
 Diane Wilkinson: The Englishwoman in labour
 Nicole Chollet: A nurse at the clinic
 Monique Messine: The florist
 Jean-Pierre Rambal: A man at the bank, in the restaurant, in the lift...
 Albert Michel: A man at the clinic
 Grégoire Gromoff: Another 2CV owner
 Christian Marin: A cashier at the bank
 Max Desrau: The man stained at the restaurant
 Paul Mercey: The man in the phone booth
 Fulbert Janin: The postman
 Gaston Ouvrard: A man in the queue at the bank
 Jean Rupert: Auguste, the restaurant chef
 Jimmy Perrys: A man on a bicycle
 Francis Lax: Bus conductor
 Henri Poirier: The gendarme who speaks
 Tony Villemin: The employer at the jewellers
 Chantal Deberg
 Lucie Arnold
 Solange Certain
 Pierre Mirat

About the film 
The rarely used word "tracassin" was reactivated by Charles de Gaulle in a speech on 2 October 1961.

Awards 
 The 1961 Prix Courteline was awarded to Bourvil for his interpretation of the "tracassé" (the bothered).

Notes and references

External links 
 
 Synopsis and photos on bernard-luc.com

1961 films
French black-and-white films